Carbonic anhydrase 5A, mitochondrial is a protein that in humans is encoded by the CA5A gene.

Function 

Carbonic anhydrases (CAs) are a family of zinc metalloenzymes that catalyze the reversible hydration of carbon dioxide.  They participate in a variety of biological processes, including respiration, calcification, acid-base balance, bone resorption, and the formation of aqueous humor, cerebrospinal fluid, saliva, and gastric acid.  They show extensive diversity in tissue distribution and in their subcellular localization.  CA5A is localized in the mitochondria and expressed primarily in the liver.  It may play an important role in ureagenesis and gluconeogenesis.  CA5A gene maps to chromosome 16q24.3 and an unprocessed pseudogene has been assigned to 16p12-p11.2. [provided by RefSeq, Jul 2008].

References

Further reading